The following is a list of terms, used to describe disabilities or people with disabilities, which may carry negative connotations or be offensive to people with or without disabilities.

Some people consider it best to use person-first language, for example "a person with a disability" rather than "a disabled person." However identity-first language, as in "autistic person" or "Deaf person", is preferred by many people and organizations.

Language can influence individuals' perception of disabled people and disability.  Views vary with geography and culture, over time, and among individuals. Many terms that some people view as harmful are not viewed as hurtful by others, and even where some people are hurt by certain terms, others may be hurt by the replacement of such terms with what they consider to be euphemisms (e.g., "differently abled" or "special needs"). Some people believe that terms should be avoided if they might hurt people; others hold the listener responsible for misinterpreting terms used without harmful intent. For example, crazy should be avoided in describing persons or their behaviors, but is less likely to cause offense if used as an intensifier as in "crazy speed".

For some terms, the grammar structure of their use determine if they are harmful. The person-first stance advocates for saying "people with disabilities" instead of "the disabled" or "a person who is deaf" instead of "a deaf person". However, some advocate against this, saying it reflects a medical model of disability whereas "disabled person" is more appropriate and reflects the social model of disability. On the other hand, there is also a grammar structure called identity-first language that construes disability as a function of social and political experiences occurring within a world designed largely for nondisabled people.

A
A few sandwiches short of a picnic (which has numerous derivatives with no known original, e.g. "a few books short of a library"), a term meant to imply that a person has reduced or limited mental faculties
Able-bodied, there is an implied value judgement comparing a person with a disability versus one without
Abnormal
Addict
Afflicted
Attention-seeking, commonly used to label someone who is suffering emotionally
Autism or autistic, when used as an insult

B
Batty
Birth defect
Blind, especially when used metaphorically (e.g., "blind to criticism") or preceded by "the". (Although "the blind" is considered acceptable by many blind people, and organizations such as the National Federation of the Blind).
Bonkers
Brain damaged

C
Challenged
Crazy
Crazy cat lady (derogatory term typically aimed at mentally ill and neurotic women, particularly single women, spinsters who hoard cats); the term is not only considered ableist, but also misogynistic and acephobic
Cretin
Cripple used to mean "a person with a physical or mobility impairment." Its shortened form, "crip" has been reclaimed by some people with disabilities as a positive identity.
Confined to a wheelchair Implies helplessness, and that someone is to be pitied.

D
Daft, consider nonsensical or feckless
"Deaf and dumb" or "deaf-mute" or "deaf to"
Defect, defective
Deformed
Delusional
Demented, use "person with dementia"
Deranged or mentally deranged
Derp is considered by some sites to refer to those with intellectual disabilities.
Differently abled
Dim or dim-witted
 DALYs/DFLYs/QALYs: Disability or Quality Adjusted (or Free) Life Years - suggests that a nondisabled person's life years are worth more than a disabled person's
 "The Disabled" or "Disabled people" may be offensive to some, who may prefer "person with a disability" or "people with health conditions or impairments" instead. However, many people prefer "disabled person" or "disabled people", in part due to the social model of disability
Disorder
Dotard
Downie, a Dutch profanity sometimes appearing in English as "downy", used to refer to people with Down's syndrome and generally considered derogatory
Dumb, especially when preceded by "the".
Dummy (in the context of a stupid or ignorant person), used as a derogatory insult towards mentally disabled people; the term also used to be used to describe people incapable of speaking, suggestive of an insulting mannequin-like or ventriloquist's dummy-like appearance
Dwarf

E
Epileptic, especially when referring to an individual
Exceptional

F 
Feeble-minded (sometimes shortened in slang to "feeb")
Fit to refer to an epileptic seizure.
Flid to refer to someone with phocomelia from birthmother's use of thalidomide
Freak

G
Gimp or gimpy to describe a limp.

H
Handicapped, especially when preceded by "the" or "physically".
Handicapable
Hare lip
Hearing-impaired
Homebound
Hunchback, or "humpback" and "Quasimodo", especially when referring to people with scoliosis or kyphosis; generated controversy after the 1990s release of The Hunchback of Notre Dame
Hyper
Hyper-sensitive
Hysterical, typically used in reference to women.

I
Imbecile was the diagnostic term, used in the early 1900s, for people with IQ scores between 30 and 50. It is no longer used professionally. Before to the IQ test was developed in 1905, "imbecile" was also commonly used as a casual insult towards anyone perceived as incompetent at doing something.
Incapacitated
Idiot was the diagnostic term used for people with IQ scores under 30 when the IQ test was first developed in the early 1900s. It is also no longer used professionally. Before the IQ test was developed in 1905, "idiot" was also commonly used as a casual insult towards anyone perceived as incompetent at doing something.
Inmate (when referring to a psychiatric admission) 
Insane
Inspirational or inspiring, when used about somebody doing a very ordinary activity, a phenomenon of spectacle known as "inspiration porn" that is based on pity; not to be confused with legitimate public activities of mass spectacle such as Special Olympics or Paralympics, which celebrate talent without pity or mockery.
Invalid

J
Junkie

L
Lame. A reference to difficulty walking or moving. The term has since been adopted into urban slang to generally refer to something or someone as "meaningless" or "without worth", e.g. "He told us a lame excuse for why he had not done the work."
Losing one's mind
Losing / Lost one's marbles
LPC - Likely to become a public charge
Lunatic or looney

M
Mad, madman 
Mad as a hatter or "mad hatter", derogatory term (referring to a mentally ill person or a person with brain damage and dementia caused by heavy metal poisoning) popularized especially due to the fictional character of the same name
Maniac
Mental or mentally deficient, mental case, defective, disabled, deranged, or ill
Midget
Mong, Mongol, Mongoloid, or Mongolism for Down syndrome.
Moron, moronic
Munchkin (see "Midget" above), a term derived from the 1930s feature film The Wizard of Oz which had a cast of Little Persons; explicitly referring to a Little Person as a Munchkin is considered offensive
Mute
Mutant, referring to someone with an uncommon genetic mutation

N
Narc, narcissist this does not mean the same as abuser
Not the brightest bulb / Not the sharpest tool in the shed (mentally disabled derogatory term)
Nut, nuts, or nutter, nuthouse, etc.

O
Out to lunch (slang term for "crazy" or mentally ill)

P
Patient
Paraplegic
Psycho(tic)
Psychopath, which is an old term that used to mean a person with a mental illness

Q
Quasimodo, which translates to "half-formed" or more commonly "deformed", and made infamous by the fictional character Quasimodo, a deformed man with kyphosis who later appeared in a popular Disney film in the 1990s (see Hunchback above)

R
Retard/Retarded although before circa the 1990s this was considered acceptable by most non-disabled people and organizations. Also known as the r-word.

S
Scatterbrained
Schizo especially as an adjective, meaning "erratic" or "unpredictable" or, for the former two, to refer to an individual.
Schizophrenic, when referring to an individual
Screw loose "(has a) screw loose", a British slang term that originally meant eccentric, neurotic or slightly mentally ill; generally considered offensive to mentally ill people
Senile
Slow
Sluggish
Sociopath
Spastic/Spaz/Spakka—especially in the UK and Ireland. Previously referred to muscle spasticity or a person with cerebral palsy, which may involve muscle spasms. Also used to insult someone uncoordinated or making jerking movements.
Special
Special Needs
SPED
Stone Deaf
Stricken
Stupid
Subnormal
Supercrip
Sufferer

T
Tard, short for "retard"; see retard above.
Thick
Tone deaf
Toxic (when referring someone or something as "problematic").

U 
 Unclean
Unfortunate
Unhinged

V
Victim of an ailment,
Vegetable

W
Wacko
Wheelchair bound and "confined to a wheelchair", use "person who uses a wheelchair"
Window licker

Y
 "Yuppie flu" used as a pejorative term for chronic fatigue syndrome. This originated from the media stereotype of people with CFS as ambitious, young, and affluent, and not have a genuine illness, neither of which is an accurate portrayal.

External links
Disability etiquette - Tips On Interacting With People With Disabilities - United Spinal Association
Inclusive language: words to use when writing about disability - Office for Disability Issues and Department for Work and Pensions (UK)
 
List of terms to avoid when writing about disability - National Center on Disability and Journalism
Research and Training Center on Independent Living, University of Kansas, Guidelines: How to Write about People with Disabilities (9th edition)

See also
Ableism
List of age-related terms with negative connotations

References

Terms
Disabilities